Joseph James Russo (July 5, 1944 – May 26, 2019) was an American baseball coach and shortstop. He served as the head coach at St. John's from 1974 to 1995. He led St. John's to the 1978 College World Series and 1980 College World Series. As a senior captain shortstop for St. John's, he led the Redmen to the 1966 College World Series where he was named to the All-Tournament team.

Head coaching record

College baseball

References

St. John's Red Storm baseball coaches
St. John's Red Storm baseball players
1944 births
2019 deaths